"Walk with You" is a song by Ringo Starr, released as a single from his 2010 studio album Y Not. It features fellow former Beatle Paul McCartney on backing vocals. The track was not originally conceived as a collaboration with McCartney, who originally only planned to play bass on "Peace Dream." 

The song was also used as Starr's entry on the iTunes exclusive 4-track Beatles EP 4: John Paul George Ringo, released in 2014.

Composition
In a promotional video, Starr said that "Walk with You" was originally intended to be a "gospelly" song. Starr called Van Dyke Parks and asked him to collaborate on writing a "God song," but Parks said he did not write about God. They reworked the melody and completed the track as a song about the power of friendship. During the recording of "Peace Dream," Starr played Paul McCartney several tracks he had completed for Y Not. McCartney developed the "trailing" duet in the melody of "Walk with You."

Personnel
Ringo Starr – drums, vocals, background vocals and percussion
Paul McCartney – additional vocals, bass
Steve Dudas – guitar
Ann Marie Calhoun – violin
Bruce Sugar – keyboards and string arrangement

References

2009 singles
2009 songs
Ringo Starr songs
Songs about friendship
Songs written by Ringo Starr
Songs written by Van Dyke Parks
Music published by Startling Music